Diba may refer to:

Textiles 
 Diba, a fabric, damascened silk brocade
 Diba, a pointed hat of the Kabiri of New Guinea

Places 
 Diba, a neighborhood in Plumtree, Zimbabwe
 Abu Dhiba, a village in western Saudi Arabia
 Ra's Diba, a cape in United Arab Emirates

People 
 Diba (surname)
 Diba Chandra Hrangkhawl, politician from Tripura, India

See also 
 Dibba